Lude Ahiara is a community in Ahiara Mbaise, Nigeria with seven kindreds: Lude Ama, Umuoriaku, Umunwaja, Umuokoro, Umuezeala, Umuokpo, Umulogho. Lude Ahiara one of the communities of Ahiara-Ofor Iri and located within the Ahiazu Local Government Area of Mbaise, Imo State. It is surrounded by other communities namely: Oru, Amakpaka Nnarambia, Obodo Ahiara and Obohia Ekwerazu.

The village market is called Nkwo Lude and its day is every two Nkwo Market day (Eight days). The proximity of Nkwo Lude to Afor Oru (with a big timber market), Eke Ahiara Junction (in Nnarambia/Ahiara Centre) and its good road connections to other communities places the area in a vantage position for huge economic growth especially with the emerging urban area of Nnarambia with the presence of motor park, Mbaise Catholic cathedral and Imo Polyethnic and local government headquarters at Afor Oru.

History 
The Eze Lude was Late Eze Jude. S. Anyamele the Ude 1 of Lude Ahiara and the first Eze Lude after the community gained autonomy from the government. A new traditional ruler has been selected to be crowned.

Lude people are originally farmers and well known for their industriousness, community spirit and pride in their culture. The age grade and Aladimma institutions and Town Union are very strong and form part of the governance structure of the community. The people of the area also embraced early western education that came with the catholic missionaries and had profound impact, with many indigenes of Lude being priests, professors, teachers and civil servants. Many sons and daughters of Lude have long migrated to others parts of the world in search of greener pasture and businesses with a significant population of them in Cameroon, Ghana, Gabon, Mozambique and United States of America.

Notable Institutions 
Educational institutions located in Lude include the famous Ahiazu Secondary School Ahiazu Mbaise (ASSAM), and Community Primary School Lude. It also boast of a Community Health Centre, Catholic church parish, and with modern amenities such as public water supply, electricity and mobile telephone services.

Festive period that attract indigenes of Lude abroad, friends and visitors are mainly during Christmas (on Nkwo Lude market day immediately after December 25) and annual Ji Mbaise (new yam festival) on August 15. There use to be wrestling competition in the past with the various kindreds challenging each other for positions.

Towns in Imo State